The Abadan refinery ( Pālāyeshgāh-e Ābādān) is an oil refinery located in Abadan near the coast of the Persian Gulf.

History
Built by the Anglo-Persian Oil Company (later BP) on the basis of a lease obtained in 1909, it was completed in 1912 as a pipeline terminus, and was one of the world's largest oil refineries. In 1927, oil exports from Abadan totalled nearly 4.5 million tons.

Its nationalisation in 1951 prompted the Abadan Crisis and ultimately the toppling of the democratically elected prime minister Mossaddegh.

The refinery was largely destroyed in September 1980 by Iraq during the initial stages of the Iraqi invasion of Iran's Khuzestan province, triggering the Iran–Iraq War. It had a capacity of 635,000 b/d in 1980 and formed a refinery complex with important petrochemical plants.

In December 2017, Sinopec signed a $1 billion deal to expand the Abadan refinery. Work on the second phase of the project was suspended in March 2020 as a result of the COVID-19 pandemic in Iran.

See also

 Horace Walter Rigden
 List of oil refineries
 National Iranian Oil Refining and Distribution Company
 Petroleum
 Siege of Abadan

References

Further reading
 J. W. Williamson, In a Persian Oil Field: A Study in Scientific and Industrial Development (E. Benn, 1927; 2nd edition 1930)

External links

 
 
 
 Facts about the Iran refinery industry

Oil refineries in Iran
Abadan, Iran
1912 establishments in Iran
Anglo-Persian Oil Company
Buildings and structures in Khuzestan Province